Walking Tall Part 2 is the 1975 sequel to the crime/action film, Walking Tall. Walking Tall Part 2 was directed by Earl Bellamy, and produced by Charles A. Pratt. The film stars Bo Svenson as Buford Pusser, replacing Joe Don Baker, who played Pusser in the first Walking Tall film. The on-screen title of the film is Part 2 Walking Tall: The Legend of Buford Pusser. The film was followed in 1977 by Walking Tall: Final Chapter, also starring Svenson.

Plot
Sheriff Buford Pusser continues his one-man war against moonshiners and a ruthless crime syndicate after the murder of his wife in late 1960s Tennessee.

Cast

 Bo Svenson: Buford Pusser
 Luke Askew: Pinky Dobson
 John Davis Chandler: Ray Henry
 Robert DoQui: Obra Eaker
 Leif Garrett: Mike Pusser
 Bruce Glover: Grady Coker
 Dawn Lyn: Dwana Pusser
 Brooke Mills: Ruby Ann
 Logan Ramsey: John Witter
 Lurene Tuttle: Grandma Helen Pusser
 Angel Tompkins: Marganne Stilson
 Noah Beery Jr.: Carl Pusser
 Richard Jaeckel: Stud Pardee
 Archie Grinalds: A.C. Hand
 Allen Mullikin: Floyd Tate
 Frank McRae: Steamer Riley
 Red West: Sheriff Tanner

Behind the Scenes
Joe Don Baker, who played Buford Pusser in the first film, declined to reprise his role; Pusser himself had agreed to take his own role, but he died in an automobile accident before filming began. His death is discussed at the end of the movie. The police report is shown. Pusser's death would be further elaborated in the next sequel, Walking Tall: Final Chapter.

References

External links
 
 
 
 BFI | Film & TV Database | Part 2, Walking Tall (1975)

Walking Tall (films)
1975 films
1970s crime drama films
American crime drama films
American International Pictures films
American sequel films
American police detective films
Films directed by Earl Bellamy
Films scored by Walter Scharf
Films set in Tennessee
Films shot in Tennessee
McNairy County, Tennessee
1975 drama films
1970s English-language films
1970s American films